Jurensley Lorencio Martina (born 10 August 1993) is a Curaçaoan footballer who plays forward for Jong Holland and the Curaçao national team.

Club career
Born in Willemstad, Netherlands Antilles, Martina began his career with SV Victory Boys in the Sekshon Pagá, the highest level of football in Curaçao. He parted with the club after his first season, signing with CSD Barber, whom he helped to their sixth national championship in 2014.

International career
Martina plays for the national team of Curaçao. He made his debut for the first team in the ABCS Tournament on 13 July 2012, scoring on his debut, in a 3–2 loss against Aruba. He then played for Curaçao U-20 in qualifying for the CONCACAF Under-20 Championship, scoring against Dominica U-20 twice. He also played in the 2012 Caribbean Cup qualification for the first team against Saint Lucia, Guyana and Saint Vincent and the Grenadines that same year. On 1 February 2015, Martina scored twice in the ABCS Tournament in a 4–0 against Bonaire.

Career statistics

International
As of match played 26 November 2022

Scores and results list Curaçao's goal tally first.

Honours 
Barber
 Sekshon Pagá (1): 2014

References

External links

1993 births
Living people
People from Willemstad
Dutch Antillean footballers
Curaçao footballers
Curaçao international footballers
Sekshon Pagá players
Association football forwards
Centro Social Deportivo Barber players
S.V. Victory Boys players